Buron Rogers Fitts (March 22, 1895 – March 29, 1973) was the 29th lieutenant governor of California, from 1927 to 1928, and Los Angeles County district attorney thereafter until 1940.

Early life
Born in Belcherville, Texas, Fitts received his law degree in 1916 from the University of Southern California and while a student there worked as a clerk for attorney Earl Rogers.

Fitts was a severely injured veteran of World War I whose base of political support lay in the American Legion organization of war veterans. He had been shot in the knee in the Battle of Argonne and limped for the rest of his life.

Career
He was appointed deputy district attorney for Los Angeles County in 1920 during the term of Thomas Lee Woolwine and chief deputy in 1924 under Asa Keyes. He was elected lieutenant governor in 1926 and served in the administration of Governor C.C. Young. Fitts's term as lieutenant governor was from January 4, 1927, to November 30, 1928. Governor Young appointed H. L. Carnahan as lieutenant governor on December 4, 1928, to succeed Fitts.

In 1928, Keyes was indicted for bribery (in connection with the Julian Petroleum Company scandal), and Fitts resigned effective November 30 of that year to become a special prosecutor in that case. He was elected district attorney (the county's chief law officer) as well.

Fitts was also on Paramount Pictures’ dole.  In 1930, Clara Bow's fiancé Rex Bell (wrongfully) accused Daisy De Voe, Clara Bow's secretary, of embezzlement and extortion.  Fitts saw to it that Daisy was arrested, wasn't allowed to contact a lawyer, interrogated for twenty-seven straight hours, jailed without being charged and her safe deposit box was searched without a warrant.  No evidence was found, and Daisy refused to sign a confession. She subsequently filed a false imprisonment suit against Fitts, and in retaliation, he induced a Grand Jury to indict Daisy on thirty-five counts of grand theft. After three days of deliberations, the jury found her not guilty on thirty-four charges, and, inexplicably, guilty for one.  She served an 18-month sentence; the judge was also friendly with Paramount executives.

Fitts was elected for a second term in 1932, and he investigated the death of Hollywood producer-director-screenwriter Paul Bern, the husband of actress Jean Harlow.  Samuel Marx, in his book Deadly Illusions (1990) accuses Fitts of having been bribed by Metro-Goldwyn-Mayer studio officials to accept a fabricated version of Bern's suicide to avoid scandal in Hollywood.  Fitts was also indicted for bribery and perjury in 1934 for allegedly taking a bribe to drop a statutory rape charge against a millionaire real-estate promoter. He was acquitted two years later. He was also accused of using his position to block action against the rapist of Patricia Douglas at the MGM Sales Convention in 1937, a case that was the subject of David Stenn's 2007 documentary film Girl 27.

Fitts was elected to a third term as district attorney in 1936 and remained until 1940, when he was defeated by a reform candidate, John F. Dockweiler.  Fitts, J.D. Fredricks (1903–1915), and Steve Cooley (2000-2012) are the only Los Angeles County District Attorneys to serve three complete terms.

On March 7, 1937, Fitts was wounded by a volley of shots fired through the windshield of his car.  Nobody was ever arrested in that case.

He joined the Army Air Corps in 1942 with the rank of major. He was chief, intelligence, Pacific Overseas Air Technical Services.

Death
Fitts' last residence was in Three Rivers, in Tulare County, California, where he committed suicide by a pistol shot to the head on March 29, 1973, one week after his 78th birthday.

References

 For the People — Inside the Los Angeles County District Attorney's Office 1850-2000 (2001) by Michael Parrish. 
 He Usually Lived With a Female: The Life of a California Newspaperman (2006) by George Garrigues. Quail Creek Press. 
 Deadly Illusions by Samuel Marx and Joyce Vanderveen (Random House, New York, 1990), re-published as Murder Hollywood Style - Who Killed Jean Harlow's Husband? (Arrow, 1994)

External links
 For the People excerpt quoted in Los Angeles District Attorney Web site
   Social Security Death Index
   University of California biography

1895 births
1973 suicides
Lieutenant Governors of California
District attorneys in California
United States Army Air Forces officers
United States Army Air Forces personnel of World War II
People from Montague County, Texas
Military personnel from Texas
USC Gould School of Law alumni
Suicides by firearm in California
American politicians who committed suicide
20th-century American politicians
United States Army personnel of World War I
People acquitted of corruption
American shooting survivors